Hexamethylcyclotrisilazane is a chemical compound with formula  or .  Its molecule consists of a six-member ring of three silicon atoms alternating with three nitrogen atoms, with two methyl groups bonded to each silicon and one hydrogen atom bonded to each nitrogen.  It can be described as a derivative of the hypothetical compound cyclotrisilazane , or as a cyclic trimer of hypothetical dimethylsilazane .

The compound is a clear colorless liquid at room temperature.

The compound has been extensively studied because of its applications in the semiconductor industry, as a precursor for the deposition of fils of silicon nitride and silicon carbonitride and as an additive in photoresist  formulations.  It has also been proposed as an additive to silica for liquid chromatography.

Other names for the compound are 2,2,4,4,6,6-hexamethyl-1,3,5,2,4,6-triazatrisilinane (IUPAC), 1,1,3,3,5,5-hexamethyl-2,4,6,1,3,5-triazatrisilinane, and 2,4,4,6,6-hexamethyl-1,3,5-triaza-2,4,6-trisilacyclohexane.  The name is often abbreviated HMCTS or HMCTSZN.

Structure
The silicon-nitrogen ring is nearly planar. The interatomic distances are: Si-N = 1.728 Å,  Si-C = 1.871 Å, C-H = 1.124 Å.  The approximate bond angles are N-Si-N ≈ 108°, Si-N-Si ≈ 127°,  C-Si-C ≈ 109°, H-C-H ≈ 112°.

Synthesis
The compound was obtained in 1948 by Brewer and Haber by introducing dimethyldichlorosilane  into liquid ammonia , and then extracting the precipitate with benzene. The reaction yields a mixture of compounds, chiefly the trimer and the tetramer octamethyltetrasilazane. The trimer can be separated from the other products by fractional distillation.

The yield can be improved by converting the tetramer, through reaction with hydrogen in the presence of suitable catalysts.

See also
 2,2,4,4,6,6-hexamethyl-1,3,5-trithiane

References

Nitrogen heterocycles
Silicon heterocycles